The McClures are an American contemporary worship duo composed of musicians Paul McClure and Hannah McClure. The duo released their debut studio album, The Way Home, on August 30, 2019, through Bethel Music. The album spawned the singles "Now I See", "Only Have One", and "Reign Above It All". The Way Home debuted at No. 36 on Billboard's Top Christian Albums Chart in the United States.

History

Background
Paul and Hannah McClure first began leading worship at their local church as teenagers in their hometown of High Point, North Carolina. In 2009, they attended the WorshipU conference hosted by Bethel Music in Redding, California. This influenced the duo's cross-country relocation to Redding, where they began serving as worship leaders and songwriters at Bethel Church in 2011.

2019-present: The Way Home, Christmas Morning

The McClures made their career debut on Bethel Music with the release of "Now I See" on July 12, 2019, as the lead single to their debut studio album, The Way Home. On August 16, 2019, the duo released "Only Have One" as the second single from the album, The Way Home. "Only Have One" debuted at number 49 on the US Hot Christian Songs chart. The duo released their debut studio album, The Way Home, on August 30, 2019. The album debuted at number 36 on the Top Christian Albums Chart in the United States.

On October 23, 2020, The McClures released "Christmas Morning" as the lead single to their holiday-themed extended play, Christmas Morning. The EP was released on November 13, 2020. On February 12, 2021, the duo released "Reign Above It All" as their third single from the album The Way Home (2019).

Discography

Albums

EPs

Singles

See also
 List of Christian worship music artists

References

External links
 

Musical groups established in 2019
Musical groups from California
American Christian musical groups
Performers of contemporary worship music
2019 establishments in California